Eye Manor, Eye, Herefordshire, England is a Carolean manor house dating from the late 17th century, and was built for Ferdinando Gorges. Noted for its interior plasterwork, the house is a Grade I listed building.

History
Ferdinando Gorges (c.1565-1647) was an English soldier whose establishment of the Province of Maine saw him called the "Father of English Colonization in North America". His descendant, also Ferdinando, bought the Eye estate in 1673 and began building the house shortly thereafter. A datestone above the main doorway carries a date of 1680. Coats of arms within the house carry the insignia of Gorges and of his wife, Meliora Gorges, née Hilliard. Gorges' son, Henry sat as a member of parliament for Herefordshire in the early 18th century.

In the 20th century Eye Manor was the home of the publisher Christopher Sandford, who owned the Golden Cockerel Press, and his wife Lettice Sandford. Their son Jeremy Sandford, the writer and director of the television drama Cathy Come Home, grew up at the house. Following his death in 2003, the manor was sold.

In 2009 the house was bought by the Conservative politician Robert Jenrick for £1.1 million. In April 2020, during the coronavirus pandemic, Jenrick, then serving as the Secretary of State for Housing, Communities and Local Government, became the subject of media interest when he visited the house, and his parents' home in Shrewsbury, in apparent contravention of the government's advice against non-essential travel.

Architecture and description
Eye Manor is noted for the quality of its interior decoration, which Pevsner and Brooks describe as "an astonishing surprise" within an exterior "as noncommittal as a black double-breasted overcoat". The house is built of red brick to a traditional double-pile plan. Later additions include the doric porch which dates from the 18th century, and some minor modification undertaken in the early 20th century. It is of two storeys, with cellars and attics.

The plain exterior conceals the embellished interior which has "gorgeously enriched" panelling, bolection moulded stone fireplaces and "outstanding" plaster ceilings. The quality and style of the plasterwork in the house bears similarities to that at Holyrood Palace which led Geoffrey Beard, a historian of English decorative arts, to suggest that the same craftsmen may have been involved.

Eye Manor is a Grade I listed building.

Notes

References

Sources
 
 
 
 

 
 

Country houses in Herefordshire
Grade I listed buildings in Herefordshire
Grade I listed houses
Houses completed in 1680
1680 establishments in England